is a Japanese actor.

Filmography

TV dramas

Films

Stage

Variety

DVD

Advertisements

CD

Radio

Awards

References

External links
 
Kaname Endo at Kinenote 
Kaname Endo at the TV Drama Database 

Japanese male actors
People from Noda, Chiba
Avex Group talents
Actors from Chiba Prefecture
1983 births
Living people